The Heimwehfluhbahn (DIH) is a funicular at Interlaken in the Swiss Canton of Bern. The funicular provides access to the hilltop restaurant, an observation tower, an O scale model railway, a children's playground and a bobsleigh run (a second one existed but has since become overgrown and unused).

Overview
There are two wooden cars dating from 1906, operating on a single track of narrow gauge track with a central passing loop. With curtains at the unglazed windows, the line presents an intentionally heritage image. A single journey takes 2 minutes.

See also 
 List of funicular railways
 List of funiculars in Switzerland
 List of heritage railways and funiculars in Switzerland

References

External links 

Heimwehfluhbahn article in Funimag

1906 establishments in Switzerland
Bernese Oberland
Funicular railways in Switzerland
Heritage railways in Switzerland
Narrow gauge railways in Switzerland
Railway lines opened in 1906
Transport in Interlaken